Alafors is a town and the seat of the municipality of Ale Municipality, Västra Götaland County, Sweden. Today it is considered part of Nödinge-Nol, a northeastern neighborhood. It is located off the E45, about 30 km north of Gothenburg and approximately 1 km from the east bank of the Göta River.

In 1970 the town grew up with the railroad town Nol and 1990 with Nödinge, which today form an urban area, Nödinge-Nol. Alafors contains the Ale municipal building, whose facade has enamel artwork by Endre Nemes. There is a high school, park, Ahlafors IF football club which play at Furulundsparken, and a ski slope. A former spinning mill was located here which ceased operations in 1966. Swedish death metal group Eructation was formed in Alafors in 1988.

Notable people
Erik Arvidsson - chess player

References

Populated places in Västra Götaland County
Populated places in Ale Municipality